The 2018 Sun Belt Conference Championship Game was played on December 1, 2018, between the Mountaineers of Appalachian State and the Ragin' Cajuns from Louisiana. The game was played at Kidd Brewer Stadium in Boone, North Carolina, due to Appalachian State's better conference record. This was the second time these teams played this year; the first meeting finished 27–17 in the Mountaineers' favor. The winner of the game would play in the R+L Carriers New Orleans Bowl while the loser would play in the Cure Bowl.

History
In 1987, the National Collegiate Athletic Association (NCAA) approved a proposal made by two Division II conferences that allowed any conference with 12 football members to split into divisions and stage a championship game between the divisional winners, with that game not counting against NCAA limits on regular-season contests. However, the rule would not see its first use until 1992, when the Southeastern Conference, which had added Arkansas and South Carolina the previous year, launched its title game. In early 2016, NCAA legislation was passed that largely deregulated FBS conference championship games, allowing a conference with fewer than 12 teams to stage a championship game that featured either (1) the top two teams at the end of a full round-robin conference schedule, or (2) the winners of each of two divisions, with each team playing a full round-robin schedule within its division. Several months later the Sun Belt Conference announced that they would be introducing the football championship game to its sponsor sport starting in 2018.

In 2017, the conference announced that its teams would compete in two divisions, to determine participants for a conference championship game. The East and West divisions were created with five teams each, with the top teams to meet in a championship game played at the home stadium of the team with the best College Football Playoff ranking. If neither team was ranked in the CFP selection committee, the conference would determine home field using a formula based on six computer ratings that were used in the old Bowl Championship Series standings.

Teams

Louisiana

The Ragin' Cajuns came into the 2018 season off of a 5–7 record. They also entered the season to a new face, Billy Napier, after previous head coach, Mark Hudspeth had been fired after three consecutive years of shortcomings and four consecutive New Orleans Bowl victories. Hoping to capitalize on a new face, the Cajuns did just that finishing 7–5 and in the Conference Championship after finishing first in the West Division, but only finishing in a tie for fourth place in the entire conference. The Ragin' Cajun come into the game after beating out-of-conference Grambling State Tigers and the New Mexico State Aggies and Sun Belt Conference foes Texas State Bobcats, Arkansas State Red Wolves, Georgia State Panthers, South Alabama Jaguars, and the winner-take-all game against the Louisiana-Monroe Warhawks. The Ragin' Cajuns were defeated by No. 16 Mississippi State Bulldogs, Coastal Carolina Chanticleers, No. 1 Alabama Crimson Tide, Appalachian State Mountaineers, and the Troy Trojans.

Appalachian State

The Mountaineers came into the 2018 season off of a 9–4 season, a Sun Belt Co-Championship, and a Dollar General Bowl victory and shut out 34-0, against the Toledo Rockets. Since coming into the Sun Belt Conference in 2014, the Mountaineers have flourished, finishing every year above .500, two conference championships, two Camellia Bowl wins, a Dollar General Bowl win, and even ranked No. 25 in the nation for a week in 2018, which was the first time in the programs history. The Mountaineers come into the game after beating out-of-conference Charlotte 49ers, Gardner–Webb Runnin' Bulldogs, and Sun Belt foes South Alabama Jaguars, Arkansas State Red Wolves, Louisiana Ragin' Cajuns, Coastal Carolina Chanticleers, Texas State Bobcats, Georgia State Panthers, and the winner-take-all game against the Troy Trojans. Their only losses of 2018 were to No. 10 Penn State Nittany Lions and the Georgia Southern Eagles.

Appalachian State vs. Louisiana series history
This match up will be the 6th all time meeting against the Mountaineers and the Ragin' Cajuns. They last played each other earlier this year on October 20. Appalachian State defeated Louisiana, 27-17. That win made it five in the row, leading to the Mountaineers first appearance in the AP Poll. After the regular season match up, Appalachian State leads the all time series 5-0.

Game summary

Scoring summary

Statistics

References

Championship Game
Sun Belt Conference Football Championship Game
Appalachian State Mountaineers football games
Louisiana Ragin' Cajuns football games
Sun Belt Conference Football Championship Game
Sun Belt Conference Football Championship Game